The 2016 Indiana Republican presidential primary was held on May 3 in the U.S. state of Indiana as one of the Republican Party's primaries ahead of the 2016 presidential election. This was a winner-take-all election, so Donald Trump, who came in first in the popular vote, won all the delegates.

The Democratic Party held their own Indiana primary on the same day, which was won by Bernie Sanders. Other primaries were not scheduled for that day.

Following Trump's win, both Cruz and Kasich suspended their campaigns and Trump was declared the presumptive GOP nominee.

Primary

Pre-primary strategies
By late April, Cruz and Kasich had both been eliminated from getting 1,237 delegates, but they still had a chance to accumulate enough delegates to force a contested convention in Cleveland. Realizing this, Cruz and Kasich attempted to focus their efforts in different states, with Cruz challenging Trump head-to-head in Indiana and Kasich challenging Trump head-to-head in Oregon and New Mexico. However, the alliance was tenuous at best, with Kasich telling voters in Indiana the next day to still vote for him and Cruz downplaying the alliance later in the week; it also met with disapproval from 58% of Indiana voters.

Final attempts to stop Trump
Indiana was seen as the final state for the "Stop Trump" movement.  Indiana, whose delegates were awarded winner-take all statewide and by congressional district, was seen as essential to denying Trump the 1,237 delegates needed to secure the nomination. Following the Acela primaries, Cruz attempted to bolster his chances by announcing that, if nominated, he would name Fiorina as his running mate. Fiorina had served as a Cruz campaign surrogate since March after suspending her own presidential campaign in February and Cruz hoped that Fiorina could help his campaign in Indiana and her home state of California. On April 29, 2016, Governor Mike Pence of Indiana, who eventually became Donald Trump's running mate, announced that he would vote for Cruz in the primary election. However, Cruz's posturing and endorsements proved to be insufficient, as Trump handily won Indiana with 53% of the vote, despite being outspent by a margin of more than 4–1. Cruz lost Indiana by a wide margin to Trump (53% to 37% with Kasich at 8%) and subsequently dropped out of the race.

Trump emerges as Republican nominee
Cruz lost Indiana by a wide margin to Trump (53% to 37% with Kasich at 8%) and subsequently dropped out of the race. As a result, Reince Priebus, Republican National Committee chairman, tweeted that Trump was the presumptive nominee in the GOP. The next day, Kasich also suspended his campaign, leaving Trump as the only candidate in the race. Despite his endorsement of Cruz, Mike Pence went on to become Trump's running mate.

Opinion polling

Results

Trump won Indiana by a considerable margin statewide. He won nearly all regions of the state except for several counties in northeast Indiana containing the Fort Wayne and Elkhart areas, which Cruz won.

References

Indiana
Republican primary
2016
May 2016 events in the United States